Slobodan Čašule (September 27, 1945 – December 18, 2015) was Foreign Minister of the Republic of Macedonia in 2001–2002; he was appointed November 30, 2001.
He became well known for his strong policy of the protection of the state name in the United Nations sponsored negotiations with Greece in the Macedonia naming dispute. Čašule was the ambassador of Macedonia to Spain.

He was the son of the Macedonian writer Kole Čašule.

References

Foreign Ministers of North Macedonia
2015 deaths
Macedonian politicians
Macedonian diplomats
1945 births
Ambassadors of North Macedonia to Spain